Siva Subrahmanyam Banda is an Indian-American aerospace engineer. He is Director of the Control Science Center of Excellence and Chief Scientist for the Aerospace Systems Directorate at the United States Air Force Research Laboratory at Wright-Patterson Air Force Base. He has taught at Wright State University, the University of Dayton, and the Air Force Institute of Technology.

Banda was elected as a member into the National Academy of Engineering in 2004 for leadership in the development of multivariable control theory and its applications to an array of military vehicles.

Background
Siva Banda was born in Andhra Pradesh, India. He received a Bachelor of Science degree in electrical engineering from the Regional Engineering College, Warangal, India in 1974, followed by a Master of Science degree in aerospace engineering from the Indian Institute of Science, Bangalore, India in 1976. He then came to the United States and attended college briefly at the University of Cincinnati before transferring to Wright State University in Dayton, Ohio, where he earned another Master of Science in systems engineering in 1978. Banda continued to further his studies and completed his Ph.D. in aerospace engineering at the University of Dayton in 1980. His doctoral dissertation was entitled "Maximum likelihood identification of aircraft lateral parameters with unsteady aerodynamic modeling".

Career
Banda joined the U.S. Air Force Flight Dynamics Laboratory at Wright-Patterson Air Force Base (WPAFB) in 1981 as an aerospace research engineer in the Flight Controls Division. He started his career as an in-house researcher.

Banda then served as group leader and program manager before being promoted to branch chief, a position in which he served from 1995 thru 1996. From 1996 thru 2000, he served as technical leader for the Air Vehicles Directorate at the United States Air Force Research Laboratory (AFRL) at WPAFB. From 2000 thru 2011, he served as the Director of the Control Science Center of Excellence and Senior Scientist for the Air Vehicles Directorate at AFRL at WPAFB. From 2011 thru 2012, he served as the Chief Scientist for Air Vehicles Directorate, AFRL, WPAFB. Currently he is Chief Scientist of the Aerospace Systems Directorate at AFRL/WPAFB.

Professional accomplishments
Banda is a technical adviser to the Air Force Office of Scientific Research, Defense Advanced Research Projects Agency, Office of Naval Research, National Aeronautics and Space Administration, and National Research Council. He serves on the American Institute of Aeronautics and Astronautics, and the Institute of Electrical and Electronics Engineers. He served on the board of Editors for the Advances in Design and Control series published by the Society for Industrial and Applied Mathematics. He is a Fellow of the Air Force Research Laboratory, American Institute of Aeronautics and Astronautics and the Royal Aeronautical Society.

Patents
Banda holds two patents - one for a control mechanism for unknown systems which can be applied to an arbitrary electromechanical system without prior knowledge of its transfer function, and the second for a smart controller using artificial intelligence.

Awards and honors

 2000 IEEE Control Systems Technology Award
 2001 Evening plenary speaker, Special Sessions, IEEE Conference on Decision and Control
 2002 Fellow, Institute of Electrical and Electronics Engineers (IEEE)
 2002 Board of Governors, IEEE Control Systems Society
 2004 National Academy of Engineering
 2010 Fellow of the International Federation of Automatic Control

See also
 List of Indian Americans

External links

Biography

References

Indian emigrants to the United States
American aerospace engineers
Scientists from Vijayawada
Wright State University alumni
University of Dayton alumni
American Hindus
1951 births
Living people
University of Dayton faculty
Indian Institute of Science alumni
Wright State University faculty
Members of the United States National Academy of Engineering
Indian aerospace engineers
Engineers from Andhra Pradesh
20th-century Indian engineers
Fellow Members of the IEEE
Fellows of the International Federation of Automatic Control
Engineers from Ohio